The Macarthur Division Rugby League is a senior Rugby league competition in New South Wales, Australia, administered by the New South Wales Rugby League.  Formerly known as Group 6, the competition was, until 2019, run under the auspices of the Country Rugby League.
The geographical area covered by the former CRL Group 6 takes in much of the Southern Highlands and southern  Macarthur regions of New South Wales, extending from Marulan, New South Wales in the south, to Mount Annan/ the M5 in the north and Warragamba in the west.

Senior clubs
Due to the COVID-19 pandemic in Australia the commencement of Group 6 2020 season was postponed. Delayed, competition matches began on 2 August 2020. The number of First Grade participants decreased from nine teams in 2019 to five teams in 2020.

An unrelated change between the 2019 and 2020 seasons was the merger of the Moss Vale Dragons and Bowral Blues, forming a new club Highlands Storm.

The following table notes the clubs and the teams they fielded in the 2019 and 2020 Group 6 senior competitions: 1st Grade, Reserve Grade (2nd), Third Grade/Division 2 and Under 18s (U18), Women's tackle (Wom) and Ladies League Tag (LLT).

Past clubs 

Clubs from the greater Campbelltown, New South Wales area participated in the 1st Division Group 6 competition from 1946 to 1983. These clubs as well as other former clubs included:

Clubs from Campbelltown to feature in the 2nd Division and 3rd Division leagues from 1973 to 1983 included:

 Macquarie Fields Hawks
 Cross Roads Tavern
 Tharawal Ghosts
 Airds Colts
 Claymore Panthers
 Campbelltown Sharks
 Minto Cobras
 Ingleburn RSL

Other clubs to have played in Group 6 Lower Grades include:

 The Bowral- Robertson Pioneers
 Appin Warriors 
 Berrima Gaol 'The Colts'
 Berrima
 Hinchinbrook Hornets 
 Wingello
 Wildes Meadow
 Sutton Forest
 Bundanoon Highlanders
 Robertson Spuddies (transferred to Group 7)

Matchday 

A successful U/18s League also forms part of the senior Sunday matchday in Group 6/Macarthur Division. Gameday normally follows this schedule:
11.30 am: U/18s
1.00 pm: Reserve Grade
2.30 pm: 1st Grade

History

Berrima District Rugby League

1914–45: Berrima and Wollondilly

Rugby Union was played in the area as far back as 1890, with the Berrima District Rugby League making its debut in 1914. Teams in the 1914 premiership were Picton, Robertson, Bowral, Mittagong, Moss Vale, Thirlmere and Wildes Meadow.

Competition football resumed 1919. During the 1920s Camden, Campbelltown and, in some years, Picton teams played in the Southern Districts Rugby League. Bowral, Mittagong, Moss Vale and Thirlmere were regulars in the Berrima premiership. From 1924 to 1930, a knockout competition, the Warleigh Cup, was held at the end of the season in senior, reserve and junior grades. Between 1928 and 1930 the Warleigh Cup was played in lieu of premiership finals. In 1931 the cup was held in May.

At the northern end of the region Camden, Campbelltown, Picton left the SDRL and with Bargo and Thirlmere formed the Wollondilly association. Senior and junior competitions were held in 1929.

In the early 1930s, premiership football gave way to a plethora of challenge cups, which had begun to be introduced. The high rate of unemployment was cited as a reason for favouring challenge cups over competition. Typically, a cup was donated to a club and matches were arranged to contest its possession. A cup might change hands multiple times during a season. The club that originally owned a cup often had the right to challenge the holders in the last match of the season in which the cup was on the line. 
Names of the cups included Sommers, Citizens, Cornwall, Commercial, Dawson-Lack, Dawson-Frazer, Theo Small and Murphy. There were cups for reserve grade – Burchell, Dresher and Whyte – and junior teams – Wales & Jackson.

Competition in a round-robin format resumed in 1935, with Group 6 clubs organised in northern and southern divisions and a handicap system applied. Group 6 disbanded in 1936 and no competition was held.

Berrima District Rugby League reformed and conducted competitions in 1937. Bowral won the final 23 to nil but lost the title on a protest by Mittagong, upheld by the league. A resident of New Berrima had played throughout the season despite not being residentially qualified to play with Bowral. Despite a warning from Mittagong, he played in the final. 
Berrima mixed a four-team competition with challenge cup matches in 1938. Meanwhile, the re-formed Wollondilly District experimented with a one-day carnival premiership. A re-established Group 6 coordinated a cup draw in 1939. Despite the war, some senior football was played the following season.

Burrawang-Robertson and two Bargo teams participated in a 1944 competition with premiers Bowral and runners-up Mittagong. Campbelltown, Moss Vale, Picton and Thirlmere resumed playing the next year.

Group 6 Era

1946–68: Highland Fling

'Group 6', as it is now known, officially recommenced in 1946 with Campbelltown Kangaroos claiming the inaugural premiership undefeated. Eleven first grade teams were divided into north and south divisions, with the winners of each divisions meeting in a grand-final.

Bowral Blues and Mittagong Lions would dominate these years.

Picton Magpies would win the Group's first ever Clayton Cup with an undefeated season in 1966 under the captain- coaching of Billy Peel. The Magpies were on track to go back-to-back in 1967, entering the 1967 decider undefeated. However, in one of the Group's biggest ever boilovers, the John Cole inspired Mittagong Lions rolled the black 'n whites, denying Picton a certain back-to-back Clayton Cup.

1969–83: Campbelltown City Kangaroos. One of the CRL's Greatest Clubs Dominates

This period marks the era of the Campbelltown clubs. The rapid expansion of the Sydney metropolitan area saw a population boom in the Campbelltown area. New suburbs brought new clubs. After Campbelltown Kangaroos defeated the Bowral Blues 22–3 in the 1969 Grand Final, two new clubs were formed- the Campbelltown RSL Warriors and Campbelltown Collegians.

Captain- coached by former St George Dragons hooker Ray Corkery, the Kangaroos would win three successive Group 6 premierships- defeating Oakdale Workers in 1970 and the RSL Warriors in 1971.

Now known as the Campbelltown City Kangaroos, the club started to enshrine its Group 6 dominance with the construction of a Leagues Club to finance its League teams. This club has now morphed into Wests Leagues Campbelltown.

Contending for 4 straight premierships in 1972, the Roos were controversially defeated by Camden in the major semi final of that year. The RSL Warriors would go on to defeat Camden in the 1972 Grand Final.

Campbelltown City soon struck back though with the signature of Canterbury & Australian test centre Johnny Greaves. Greaves, possibly the best player the Group has seen, captain- coached the 'Roos to another treble- defeating Campbelltown Collegians in 1973 and Ingleburn Bulldogs in 1974 and 1975.

The Oaks would win their first premiership with a dogged 16–10 victory in the 1976 decider over Camden Rams. Captain- coached by the mercurial Les Williams, the Tigers had a week earlier thwarted City's attempts to become the first Group 6 club to win 4 consecutive premierships. Williams' men would repeat the dose in 1977 with a 22–3 thumping of Camden again. These years would prove bitter sweet for the Camden club, losing all 3 grades on Grand Final day in 1976 and 1977. Ingleburn Bulldogs lowered the Rams colours in consecutive reserve grade grand finals of 1976 & 1977.

Camden would finally break the spell with victory over the Campbelltown RSL Warriors in the 1978 Premiership. Camden's jinx returned though with the Warriors claiming revenge in 1979 with a 9–2 victory over the Rams.

Spurred into action by their first ever wooden spoon in 1979 (the first time they had missed the semi finals since 1963), Campbelltown City sought revenge for the 1980 premiership, indulging in a recruitment drive that brought former Australian schoolboy representative Paul Murray to the club as captain-coach and Bulldogs legend and hardman Phil Charlton to the club to beef up the front row. With local prominent solicitor John Marsden behind them, the 'Roos would become the first club in Group 6 history to go from last to first in one season. Murray's men lost only two games that season, going on to record a dominant 25–9 victory over the Picton Magpies in the 1980 Grand Final.

Picton would turn the tables on the 'Roos in the 1981 Grand Final, emerging triumphant 15–11. Picton were led to victory by the dominance of captain Ron Kain & hooker John White in the scrum, starving the brilliant City backline of possession.

The early 80s also saw the emergence of a brilliant Moss Vale Dragons team. Based around the youthful potential from their 1979 Reserve Grade and U/18s premiership team from 1980, the Dragons would win the 1982, 1984 and 1990 1st Grade premierships. A very exciting and tough team, the Dragons were brilliantly led by captain- coach Brian Milthorpe and boasted quality 1st Graders like Mark Knight, Chris Cumming, Owen Saunders, John Burke, Terry Loader and Shane Green.

By 1983, it was fairly apparent that there was a significant separation between the Campbelltown clubs and the rest of the Group, which was still essentially 'country' in nature. Ten out of 15 contested premierships had been won by Campbelltown City (8) or the RSL Warriors (2). There was no sign of this imbalance abating.

The NSWRL ordered ailing premiership club Newtown Jets to form a merger with the Campbelltown club. The original plan was for Newtown to regroup in the 1984 season on the sidelines and then re-enter the NSWRL premiership in 1985 as the Newtown- Campbelltown Jets. This never eventuated.

As a by-product of this merger, all Campbelltown clubs were ordered by the then NSWRL chairman Kevin Humphreys to join with the Liverpool Rugby League clubs contained within the Parramatta junior league. A Group 6 general committee vote then authorised the transfer of the Campbelltown clubs to the NSWRL.

Fittingly, Campbelltown City Kangaroos would win the last Group 6 premiership they contested in 1983. Finishing the regular season second to the Clayton Cup bound Moss Vale, the 'Roos led by Tim Sheens lowered the Dragons colours 15–2 in dramatic circumstances at Loseby Park, Bowral in the major semi final of that year. The 'Roos would defeat The Oaks 24–6 in the Grand Final of 1983 at their spiritual base, Orana Park. This would be Campbelltown City's last game as a Country Rugby League club until their return in 2011. Their senior club was a major casualty of the abortive merger with Newtown. It would take thirty years for the blue and golds to re-emerge in their rightful senior competition.

1984– 2008: A True Country League

With the departure of the Campbelltown clubs, the Group 6 Executive committee abolished 2nd Division and forced all clubs up into 1st Division. Moss Vale would claim the 1984 premiership with a 36–12 crushing of the Camden Rams.

With the loss of the Campbelltown clubs, Moss Vale was left way out in front of the remaining teams- or so it seemed. After cruising through 1984 season, the Dragons were expected to repeat the dose in 1985. With their youthful combination now hitting the peak of its powers, the red and whites destroyed Picton 42–8 in the 1985 Major Semi Final and started at Black Caviar odds to secure the Premiership in a canter. The Maggies would have other ideas though. Captain- coached by former NSWRL 1st Grader Rod Henniker, Picton caused one of the Group's biggest upsets, turning the tables 16–8 in the 1985 decider at Kirkham Park, Camden.

Group 6 clubs at this time were Moss Vale Dragons, Camden Rams, The Oaks Tigers, Oakdale Workers, Thirlmere Roosters, Picton Magpies, Bowral Blues, Narellan Jets, Mittagong Lions. Robertson Spuddies were still affiliated with the Group but were unable to field 1st Division senior teams until 1988.

Surprisingly, Henniker turned down the 1986 captain- coaching job at Picton. The Magpies certainly didn't let that affect their ambitions, going better and appointing former 1977 and 1979 St George Dragons premiership winner and front row hardman, Robert Stone to steer their club's fortunes. In a true golden era for the black and whites, Stone masterminded the 1986 and 1987 premiership successes at Victoria Park.

1986 saw the NSWRL allow Warragamba Wombats to rejoin Group 6 from the Penrith Junior League. The Wombats were successful in their first season back, with their U/18 team defeating Campbelltown City in the Grand Final. City had been granted special dispensation by the CRL to compete in the U/18 competition only as the Campbelltown- Liverpool competition lacked the numbers to compose a competition in this grade.

Warragamba wouldn't have to wait long for top grade success, claiming the 1989 Grand Final with a 22–12 victory over Oakdale Workers. This has been Warragamba's only 1st Grade premiership to date, with their club falling on tough times in the last decade. The Wombats still contest the Group 6 Second Division premiership.

Mittagong under the coaching of Grahame Andrewes would claim the Group's second Clayton Cup with a dominant undefeated season in 1991. The Lions had to overcome some nervous moments in the Grand Final of that season against a valiant Oakdale Workers team seeking its club's inaugural title. Mittagong would take both the 1st and Reserve Grade premierships that season. Andrewes was the successful mentor behind the Lions' premiership victories of 1988, 1991 and 1995.

1992 had seen the introduction of the powerful Appin Warriors club. Formed from the Campbelltown Warriors A Grade premiership team from the Wests Junior League, they would add value to the League, with the 1994 Grand Final loss to Camden Rams being their high water mark. The Warriors would come close to the senior treble that 1994 GF day, winning the U/18s and Reserve Grade against Camden, before the Rams claimed the one that mattered with a 26–4 rout of Appin. A major act of vandalism that night though by Warriors players against the very shops that sponsored them would eventually cost them their club, as they petered out at the end of the 1997 season.

The Oaks Tigers would break their premiership drought in 1992 with a commanding win over Picton. Based around a brutal forward pack that contained ex-Sydney 1st Graders Marty Quinn and Paul Fuz, the Tigers left all in their wake in a dominant season.

In 1993, Oakdale Workers would claim their inaugural Group 6 1st Grade title with a 29–14 victory over Camden Rams at Kirkham Park. Coached by Frank Marino and captained by ex- West Magpie Brian Brown, Brian Taylor and Terry Broadhead, the red and blacks capped a fine season on the day when it mattered most.

With the construction of new suburbs towards the northern end of Camden Council, both the Camden and Narellan clubs started to dominate the group towards the end of the 90s. A new club, Mount Annan Knights emerged, playing in the 1st Grade competition from 1998 to 2000. Mount Annan would struggle though alongside Narellan and Camden, eventually returning to 2nd Division.

From 2005-2007, the Goulburn Stockmen would enter the competition. With the Group 6 First Grade competition struggling and the Goulburn Club struggling to keep pace with the Canberra competition, it was mutually beneficial to see the Stockmen enter into Group 6. They came into the competition highly fancied, and it wasn’t until 2007 that they managed to take out the Group 6 title with a dramatic Win over Thirlmere Roosters at Thirlmere Sportsground, after Thirlmere front row forward Peter Jensen was sensationally sent from the field.

2008: Coached by Jamie Horner, Thirlmere Roosters would claim the last Group 6 competition under the old format with a thrilling 19–16 victory over Oakdale Workers at Community Oval, Moss Vale.

By around 2005, it was clear that both the former Campbelltown area of the Group and indeed the Group itself were struggling to compose viable senior competitions. The Wests JL had fielded varying 5–7 team A Grade competitions since 1997, with all games being played at the same venue. Furthermore, some years had seen Wests A Grade teams have to travel to the Canterbury or Parramatta Junior Leagues to compete. Group 6 had split into the haves and have nots, with the disparity of player payments at first producing an uneven competition, before the non-competitive clubs were forced into the DNC Cup. By 2007, Group 6 1st Grade competition (competed for by 12 senior clubs in 1992) had reduced to 5 teams. The Reserve Grade competition was as equally effected.

Various overtures were made between the governing bodies to seek an agreement as to forming a joint competition from 2005 onwards. For whatever reasons, agreement was unable to be reached for some time. Following the end of the 2008 season, both areas took votes with regard to rejoining of the old competition. While the clubs of the Wests JL agreed, Group 6 clubs voted against.

2009-10: The Combined Competition: A New Era Commences or does it?

After years of senior Rugby League decline in both the former Campbelltown area of the Group and the Group itself, the NSWRL and CRL agreed to form a joint senior competition for the Wests Junior League and Group 6 areas.
This competition involved ten 1st Grade clubs. Picton Magpies RLFC under the coaching of local junior and former Wests Magpies NRL Second Rower Gary Dowse claimed the first reunified premiership with a 26–12 triumph over arch-rivals Thirlmere Roosters at Kirkham Park, Camden. The combined competition fielded 54 teams in 1st Grade, Reserve Grade, 3rd Grade and through four U/18 divisions.

While the competition had its detractors, local and State League administrators viewed the reunification as a vital bulwark against the impending threat from the AFL as it seeks to establish a second team supported by Western Sydney.

Moss Vale Dragons secured the 2010 1st Grade premiership with a nail-biting 6–2 defeat of defending premiers Picton Magpies at Campbelltown Stadium. Captain- coached by Kiwi import Willie McDonald, the red n whites broke a 20-year 1st Grade premiership drought.

2011: CRL Group 6: The Combined Competition trial ends
In a major boilover, Oakdale Workers would claim their second first grade title with a heart-stopping 24–16 victory over the heavily fancied East Campbelltown Eagles team at Kirkham Park.

2012-20: Final Years in the CRL
2012 saw the East Campbelltown Eagles take that one step further from only suffering two losses in the 2011 season, one of those losses was the 2011 Grand Final against Oakdale, the Eagles blitzed the competition going through undefeated and winning the 2012 Grand Final defeating Thirlmere 44–10, The club also claimed the CRL Claytons Cup which hadn't been won by a Group 6 Club since Mittagong had won the cup in 1991.

The Picton Magpies RLFC would assert their dominance over the competition coming from nowhere in 2013 to beat Minor Premiers Mittagong in a thrilling Grand Final at Kirkham Park. Mittagong will forever live with the heartache and a rue a late missed conversion from adjacent to the uprights which would’ve sent the game into extra time.
Picton would then defend their title in 2014 on home soil at Victoria Park in a grand final rematch with Mittagong, this time easily accounting for the Lions. This would be the last time in the modern era that the Group 6 Grand Final would be played at one of the local grounds and not Campbelltown Stadium.
2015 would see Picton complete a hat trick of premierships with a Grand Final day drubbing of Camden. The chant rang out from the Campbelltown Stadium stands “Ram Soup”, as Camden would lose all 3 major grades on the day. 
2016 would be the end of the Magpie dominance with Camden running out winners 14-12 in the season finale at Campbelltown Stadium and in the process ending the glamour clubs 14 year winless run.

In a major boil over The Campbelltown City Kangaroos wiped the floor with the highly fancied Thirlmere Roosters in a night time grand final at Campbelltown Stadium. It was the 11th premiership for the 1908 club and a 34 year drought that was broken by the Roos after they rejoined the competition in 2009 through the combined competition.

Picton would return to the summit of the group 6 competition with their 4th premiership in 6 years, this time dispatching of an Oaks Tigers team that were making their first appearance on grand final day in 16 years. Picton were just too clinical and The Oaks big guns that got them on a good run to the Grand Final, just couldn’t fire.

Picton would make their 6th Grand Final in 7 years and would face their local rivals Thirlmere Roosters, who were appearing in their first grand final in 11 years. The Roosters would hold the trophy at the end of the day winning an amazing shootout 38-36 on the back of their captain coach Jake Mullaney.

2020-present: Competition joins NSWRL
With the Country Rugby League being dissolved and absorbed into the NSWRL, Group 6 became part of the NSWRL in 2020. 

A modified season interrupted by COVID-19. There were 2 clear standouts in the drastically shortened season, The 2019 Defending Premiers - Thirlmere Roosters and The Oakdale Workers. Amazingly Thirlmere who were reduced to 12 men after a sickening high shot held off the Oakdale team to record back to back premierships.

Macarthur Division Rugby League Era

2021-present: New name, New Clubs
In 2021, the competition was officially renamed the Macarthur Division Rugby League. 

Campbelltown Collegians and East Campbelltown Eagles joined competition, but the COVID-19 lockdowns saw the early cancellation of the competition's inaugural season under its new new name.

1st Grade Premiers 
Picton Magpies RLFC are Group 6's most successful ever club with twelve premiership victories.

Tip: To view original newspaper articles on matches up to 1954, hover over the blue number in the Reports column and then click on the article name. That will open the article in Trove.

Group 6 Junior League 

The following clubs in field teams in the Group 6 junior competition which runs competitions from the U/6s to U/16s. Fixtures are played of a Saturday from early April until September.

 Thirlmere-Tahmoor Roosters
 Moss Vale Dragons
 Camden Rams
 Picton Magpies
 Narellan Jets
 The Oaks JRLFC*
 Appin Dogs
 Oran Park Gregory Hills Chargers
 Mount Annan-Currans Hill Knights
 Mittagong Lions
 Warragamba Wombats
 Bowral Kookaburras
 Robertson Spuddies
Bargo Bunnies

* Oakdale Workers RLFC do not field a junior division due to their close proximity to The Oaks Tigers JRLFC. Junior Rugby League in this area was once played by the now defunct Burragorang JRLFC until the late 1980s

Memorable Facts/ Unique Stories 

Opposition players in the deep colds of Robertson would quite often resort to drinking nips of rum pre-game to keep warm.
Robertson's field is in fact on the private farm of the famous Hindmarsh family. 
A Group 6 representative team coached by Ray Corkery defeated the French touring team 2–0 at Orana Park, Campbelltown in 1975 after a power outage caused the floodlights to fail.
The New South Wales Department of Corrective Services allowed Berrima Gaol ('The Colts') to field a team in the Second Division competition from 1975 to 1979. Captain- coached by Ingleburn Bulldogs junior Kevin Holland, this real life team of 'Longest Yarders' claimed the 1975 & 1977 (undefeated) Second Division premierships. In an irony, this team was the best conditioned of any Group 6 team at the time living a professional athlete's life of strength training, cardio conditioning, ball sessions and a rigid, non- alcohol diet (except after matches apparently!) all at the expense of HMG. Berrima defeated Moss Vale 15–13 in the 1975 2nd Division decider and Macquarie Fields 22–11 in the 1977 decider. The Gaol fielded a team in the 1st Division Reserve Grade competition of 1976, qualifying for the preliminary final of that competition before succumbing 18–11 to eventual premiers Ingleburn Bulldogs RLFC.
Group 6 fielded a 3rd Division competition for the only time in 1981 with Cross Roads Hotel defeating Minto Cobras 28–8 in the Grand Final. 
Picton in 1966, Mittagong in 1991 and Campbelltown Eagles in 2012 are the only Group 6 teams to have won the Clayton Cup, awarded for being Country Rugby League's team of the year. All three teams won their Premierships with undefeated records.
Picton were on track for a consecutive undefeated season and Clayton Cup in 1967 until defeated 8-nil by John Cole's Mittagong team in a massive Grand Final boilover.
Picton were on the winning side though in the 1985 Grand Final when they defeated Moss Vale 16–8 at Kirkham Park, Camden. This was only two weeks after being decimated 42–8 in the major semi by Moss Vale.
Ron Kain is Group 6's most successful ever player, playing in 7 Grand Final winning teams (Campbelltown City 69, 70, 71, 73, 74, 75 & Picton 81)
No club has won 4 consecutive grand finals in Group 6. The closest team to this feat was Picton 2016, defeated 14–12 by Camden Rams in the Grand Final. Campbelltown City in 1972 & 1976 and Picton in 1988 were bundled out in the preliminary final of those respective seasons gunning for four straight titles.
Campbelltown City in 1975 and Camden Rams in 2016 are the only clubs to win all 3 Grades in the same year- U/18s, Reserve Grade & First Grade however, Camden also won the Ladies' LeagueTag title in 2016 making them the only club to win all 4 premier premierships in one year.
Particularly sweet for City supporters and officials in 1975 was the 40–0 defeat of their local rivals Campbelltown Collegians in the Reserve Grade Grand Final.
After being wooden spooners in 1979, Campbelltown City claimed the 1980 premiership with a dominant season in which they lost only two games. They remain the only Group 6 club to have gone from last to first in one season. City defeated Picton in the GF of that year 25–9.
Ex- Australian Kangaroos and ex- Wests Tigers coach Tim Sheens captained the Campbelltown City Kangaroos to the 1st Grade premiership in 1983 with a 24–6 defeat of The Oaks Tigers, C'town City's last match in Group 6.

See also

Rugby League Competitions in Australia
New South Wales Rugby League
Country Rugby League
List of Country Rugby League clubs in New South Wales by competition

References

External links and Sources
 Group 6 Country Rugby League – official Group 6 site
 Group 6 on Country Rugby League's official site
 Group 6 Forum- Wests Magpies Supporters Forum
 
 
 
 
 
 Rugby League Week at State Library of NSW Research and Collections

Rugby league competitions in New South Wales
Southern Highlands (New South Wales)
Macarthur (New South Wales)